Diocesan Museum of Milan, diocesan museum in Milan, Italy
 Museo diocesano di Lanciano, diocesan museum in Lanciano, Italy
 Museo diocesano di Sulmona, diocesan museum in Sulmona, Italy
 Museo diocesano (Palermo), diocesan museum in Palermo, Italy